Francis Edwin Close,  (born 24 July 1945) is a particle physicist who is Emeritus Professor of Physics at the University of Oxford and a Fellow of Exeter College, Oxford.

Education
Close was a pupil at King's School, Peterborough (then a grammar school), where he was taught Latin by John Dexter, brother of author Colin Dexter. He took a BSc in physics at St Andrews University graduating in 1967, before researching for a DPhil in theoretical physics at Magdalen College, Oxford, under the supervision of Richard Dalitz, which he was awarded in 1970. He is an atheist.

Career
In addition to his scientific research, he is known for his lectures and writings making science intelligible to a wider audience and promoting physics outreach.

From Oxford he went to Stanford University in California for two years as a Postdoctoral Fellow on the Stanford Linear Accelerator Center. In 1973 he went to the Daresbury Laboratory in Cheshire and then to CERN in Switzerland from 1973 to 1975. He joined the Rutherford Appleton Laboratory in Oxfordshire in 1975 as a research physicist and was latterly head of Theoretical Physics Division from 1991. He headed the communication and public education activities at CERN from 1997 to 2000. From 2001, he was professor of theoretical physics at Oxford. He was a visiting professor at the University of Birmingham from 1996 to 2002.

Close lists his recreations as writing, singing, travel, squash and Real tennis, and he is a member of Harwell Squash Club.

Honours and awards
He became a Fellow of the Institute of Physics (FInstP) in 1991.
The Institute of Physics awarded him its 1996 Kelvin Medal and Prize, which is given "for outstanding contributions to the public understanding of physics". 
From 1993 to 1999, he was vice-president of the British Association for the Advancement of Science. 
He was appointed an OBE in 2000. 
Since 2003, he has been Chairman of the British team (BPhO) in the International Physics Olympiad, based at the University of Leicester.
2013 Awarded the Royal Society Michael Faraday Prize
He became a Fellow of the Royal Society (FRS) in 2021.

Christmas lectures
His Royal Institution Christmas Lectures in 1993, entitled The Cosmic Onion, gave their name to one of his books. He was a member on the council of the Royal Institution from 1997 to 1999. From 2000 to 2003 he gave public lectures as professor of astronomy at Gresham College, London.

Publications
In his book, Lucifer's Legacy: The Meaning of Asymmetry, Close wrote: "Fundamental physical science involves observing how the universe functions and trying to find regularities that can be encoded into laws. To test if these are right, we do experiments. We hope that the experiments won't always work out, because it is when our ideas fail that we extend our experience. The art of research is to ask the right questions and discover where your understanding breaks down."

His 2010 book Neutrino discusses the tiny, difficult-to-detect particle emitted from radioactive transitions and generated by stars. Also discussed are the contributions of John Bahcall, Ray Davis, Bruno Pontecorvo, and others who made a scientific understanding of this fundamental building block of the universe.

In The Infinity Puzzle: Quantum Field Theory and the Hunt for an Orderly Universe (2013), Close focuses on the discovery of the mass mechanism, the so-called Higgs-mechanism.

In his 2019 book, Trinity: The Treachery and Pursuit of the Most Dangerous Spy in History, Close recounts the life and the espionage of Klaus Fuchs who passed atomic secrets to the Soviets during the race for development of the nuclear bomb. He concludes that "it was primarily Fuchs who enabled the Soviets to catch up with Americans".

Other books include: Particle Physics: A Very Short Introduction , Antimatter  and Nothing .

See also
 Gresham Professor of Astronomy

Works

rev. ed. 

rev. ed. 
 (Published in the US as Apocalypse When?)

References

External links
 Frank Close at st-andrews.ac.uk
 Frank Close at Exeter College
 Interview in The Guardian, 1 June 2004
 Radio 4 Museum of Curiosity 5 March 2008
 Frank Close's page , Conville and Walsh literary agents
 
Scientific publications of Frank Close on INSPIRE-HEP
 Jodcast Interview with Professor Frank Close on the life, research and disappearance of Bruno Pontecorvo
 Contributor to discussion on Eclipses for BBC Radio 4 programme In Our Time

Video clips
 
 

1945 births
Alumni of Magdalen College, Oxford
Alumni of the University of St Andrews
English atheists
British physicists
Theoretical physicists
Particle physicists
Quantum physicists
People associated with CERN
Fellows of Exeter College, Oxford
Living people
Officers of the Order of the British Empire
People educated at The King's School, Peterborough
People from Peterborough
Professors of Gresham College